Poltavsky is a rural locality (a khutor) in Novokiyevskoye Rural Settlement, Novoanninsky District, Volgograd Oblast, Russia. The population was 102 as of 2010. There are 5 streets.

Geography 
Poltavsky is located in forest steppe on the Khopyorsko-Buzulukskaya Plain, on the bank of the Karmanchik River, 59 km southeast of Novoanninsky (the district's administrative centre) by road. Drobyazkin is the nearest rural locality.

References 

Rural localities in Novoanninsky District